King Papaya is the fifth album by Koby Israelite, recorded and mixed in Bamba Studios, London (2007) and released independently through Circus Mayhem Records. The album comes with a 28-page story by Ofir Touche Gafla. The album is dedicated to Koby's friend Ophir Star who died shortly after mixing the album.

Track listing
 Overture - 2:43  
 The King's Laughter - 4:37  
 Peardition Girls - 4:23    
 Word Travels Fast - 2:26  
 The Moroser - 4:08  
 Still Laughing - 0:27  
 Circus Mayhem - 4:28  
 Bald Patch - 2:42  
 A Band of Gypsies - 4:16  
 Hell's Kitchen - 1:26  
 Arrival of the Telepather - 2:15  
 Into the Subconscious - 1:43  
 Meeting an Angel - 3:58  
 Jacky Jones - 1:24  
 Last Laugh - 0:53  
 Molly's Sacrifice - 4:07  
 The Saddest Joke Ever - 5:24

Personnel
 Koby Israelite: Drums, Percussion, Accordion, Keyboards, Guitar, Bouzouki, Indian Banjo, Vocals, Flute, Electric Bass, Cajon, Arrangements and Producer
 Yaron Stavi: Bass
 Sebastian Merrick: Executive Producer
 Yoad Nevo: Mastering
 Ophir Star: Mixing

References

2009 albums
Koby Israelite albums